Marianne ("Miek") Antoinette van Geenhuizen (born 17 December 1981 in Eindhoven, North Brabant) is a Dutch field hockey player who played as an attacker for Dutch clubs Oranje Zwart, HC Den Bosch and Laren. Currently she is playing for Amsterdam.

Van Geenhuizen also plays for the Netherlands national team. She was a member of the Dutch squad that won the silver medal at the 2004 Summer Olympics in Athens. She was also part of the Dutch squad that became world champions at the 2006 Women's Hockey World Cup.

At the 2008 Summer Olympics in Beijing she won an olympic gold medal with the Dutch national team beating China in the final 2–0.

References
  Dutch Olympic Committee

External links
 

1981 births
Living people
Dutch female field hockey players
Olympic gold medalists for the Netherlands
Olympic silver medalists for the Netherlands
Olympic field hockey players of the Netherlands
Olympic medalists in field hockey
Field hockey players at the 2004 Summer Olympics
Field hockey players at the 2008 Summer Olympics
Medalists at the 2004 Summer Olympics
Medalists at the 2008 Summer Olympics
Sportspeople from Eindhoven
HC Den Bosch players
Oranje Zwart players
20th-century Dutch women
21st-century Dutch women